The Eixample is a district of Valencia, Spain between the old city (Ciutat Vella). This area takes in the City's most popular shopping street on calle Colon, Marques del Turia Avenue and Ruzafa. It is also the most important commercial area, where popular department stores and shops are located. Moreover, it is very close to important points like the Mercado de Colón, the City Hall, Paz street, etc. It also has excellent public transport communication.

Architecture and design
The Eixample is characterized by long straight streets, a strict grid pattern crossed by wide avenues, and square blocks with chamfered corners (named illes in Catalan, manzanas in Spanish).

The Bullring has been the centre of Valencia's bull fighting. It was built in 1841. It is a large, impressive structure in the style of a Roman Coliseum but employing Doric ornament. With only the ring itself measuring 52 m in diameter, it is much larger as a whole, with 4 levels of colonnades and balustrades. Access to the interior is via the Bullfighting Museum only. When there are no bull-fights the bullring hosts an occasional fair, concert or circus, and closes the rest of the time. The North Station is the main railway station, 200m from the town hall and has connections with Metrovalencia lines 3 and 5, and the city bus network. It was built in 1917 with Neo-Gothic influence in the structure, it hosts an entire kaleidoscope of typically Valencian mosaics and ceramics on the themes of Valencian countryside, making it a glimpse into the local culture. It was declared Good of Cultural Heritage in 1987. The main railway station is built in modernisme (the Spanish version of Art Nouveau) style.

Mercado de Colón is another market shown off by Valencia. A gorgeous elaborate structure, spacious modernity, sort of simplified a-la-Valencia Gaudi, with a nave shooting into the sky and the colourful decorations depicting Valencian country life with Valencian ceramics. The architecture is so interesting it is surprising that the market was built in 1914, it is quite avant-garde for those time. The market is plenty of souvenir shops and coffees, and also hosts concerts every few days.

Neighbourhoods
There are three administrative neighborhoods:

Pla del Remei:

Pla del Remei is a popular area to live in Valencia and a luxury location. Its proximity to the administrative center of the city (the Town Hall), the Turia river and Colon. Colon is one of the main streets in the city center. It is also the most important commercial area, where popular department stores and shops are located. Moreover, it is very close to important points like the Mercado de Colón, Paz street, etc.
The Porta de la Mar square is a vital point in the Centre of Valencia. It is located between the River Turia and the La Glorieta gardens, near the Calle Colon and very close to the Calle de la Paz

Gran Via

Gan Via Marqués del Turia is the most expensive residential area of Valencia. It is placed in the very centre of the city and offers numerous shops and services, including schools.

Canovas is the vibrant mainstream nightlife hub of Valencia. That is to say it is preferred by people who are not after the alternative or underground, who, after a week in the office, want to pass a noisy weekend in "normal pop" and surrounded by a general Valencian crowd dressed for the weekend nightlife. Canovas is a lot more mainstream than Carmen. It is a vibrant and lively area located very close to the centre. It is very compact - most places are located on the main street (Calle serranos), although there are also a few scattered between Gran via Marques del Turia and avenida del Reino de Valencia. The main drag to the north of the circular Plaza de Canovas hosts a few vibrant disco-bars where you can dance until 4am with free entry. Salamanca Street to the south of the Plaza has a lower key pub life with international pubs and lounge cocktail bars. Canovas nightlife offers some of the most typically Valencian places, as well as a more trendy / cosmopolitan selection. A good number of venues will play solely Spanish pop, also known as "musica Espanola" or, more derogatory by those who are too cool for it, "pachanga". It is basically soft happy rock of local origin. This will usually be mixed with the latest (and sometimes by far not so latest) foreign pop and commercial electronic dance that has been in charts. This music will attract a predominantly local public of mixed age.

Ruzafa

Founded as a country estate by a Moorish ruler, Ruzafa was an independent town until the 1870s and today lies just five minutes outside the historic centre, the Barrio del Carme (Ciutat Vella). The word Ruzafa has Arab origins and means "garden". Having undergone a renaissance in recent years, it has become a hotbed of dining, shopping, and cultural activity, especially of the more alternative sort, so the type of people who helped revive El Carme not so long ago are now moving here to escape the tourists. And the resulting mix of young creatives, the older folks who've been here forever, the African immigrants down at the public telephone centres and the Chinese market vendors is one of the great things about the neighbourhood these days. Main church – historically Baroque, since it was built in the 15th century, but fairly restrained for all that - the Iglesia de San Valero, and dubbed the “Cathedral of Ruzafa.”

Ruzafa, one of the old parts of the city, is located behind the North Station, and is particularly famous for being a meeting place for the most modern bohemian people. Many of the old houses and palaces have been rebuilt and adapted as bars or pubs, restaurants. Many of this music bars and pubs have the attraction of including live music performances (rock, jazz, blues...). Ruzafa has overtaken Carmen as the city's hippest area. It is a working-class, ethnically diverse quarter that is being colonised by young creatives – Valencia's version of Brixton and Candem in London. It is full of vintage clothes shops, bike shops, homeware stores which sells work by contemporary Valencian artist, art gallery/wine shop. Restaurants range from traditional tapas and bocadillos to oysters, South American restaurants, and fusion. The park on Plaza Manuel Granero is a green space in Ruzafa, where kids play in a Wendy house, on swings and slides, or kick a football around, while adults beef up their muscles on the machines in the open-air gym or take a beer in the dappled sunlight outside Bar el Parque.

Valencia has a bit over 800,000 inhabitants, of which some 25,000 live in Ruzafa. Ruzafa district in its closest area to Reino de Valencia avenue, and offers many advantages: it is very centric, very easy to locate, it has a comfortable and very quick access to the old river Turia gardens and it has all kind of services, not only shops, bars and restaurants, but also schools, banks, medical centres, etc. An extra advantage is being so close to the Mercado de Ruzafa, specially for those fresh food lovers. The “Mercado de Ruzafa” (Ruzafa's market) is more than a market. It is the center of the economical and cultural life of this neighborhood.

References

External links

Geography of Valencia